Queen Modjadji was the hereditary female ruler and queen of Balobedu, South Africa. She is known to be mythical and historical, and she is believed to have had powers that let her control the clouds and rainfall by bringing rain to her friends and drought to their enemies.

Female rulers were known as “rain queens” or “rainmakers” around this time. Furthermore, she brought rain to the regions of any visitors who offered her gifts and tributes. As a conspicuous figure in South Africa, transforming the clouds was her specialty. She was essentially not a ruler, but a rainmaker. Men relied on her ability for security, as she would provide rain for her town’s tribe as a shield. 
The Lobedu (Lovedu) tribe believed that the queen exercised some general control over their seasons, and thus, she was held accountable for the effects of the rain conditions. She also had a team of assistants.

The queen also functioned as a ritual doctor who made medicines.  The rain medicines were stored in earthen pots in a secure part of the village. Her reputation spread from Zambezi to the Southern Ocean as having medicines for all people, including medicines that made warriors invincible by crippling their enemies.

Sources
"Majaji (c. 350 CE)" URL accessed 11/26/06
 The Spectator, Volume 97 (July 7, 1906) 
  "Changing the Seasons with "The Rain Queen" " URL accessed 12/2012
 "The Realm of a Rain-Queen A Study of the Pattern of Lovedu Society" by Eileen Jenson Krige and J.D. Krige

350 deaths
Rain Queens
Year of birth unknown
4th-century monarchs in Africa
4th-century women rulers